The Minnesota–Nebraska football rivalry is an American college football rivalry between the Minnesota Golden Gophers football team of the University of Minnesota and the Nebraska Cornhuskers football team of the University of Nebraska.

History
The rivalry can be separated into distinct eras, the first two being Minnesota's glory days, followed by Nebraska's rise to prominence. These match-ups took place when the schools were non-conference rivals, facing each other on a semi-regular basis from 1900 to 1974, then on a more intermittent basis until 1990. The Big Ten era started in 2011, when Nebraska joined the conference and played in the Legends Division (now the West Division) with Minnesota. The trophy era began in 2014 with the creation of the $5 Bits of Broken Chair Trophy.

Minnesota leads the series 36–25–2; from 1900 to 1960, they went 29–6–2 against Nebraska. Minnesota gave Nebraska their worst home loss ever with a 61–7 win in 1945. However, since 1960, Nebraska has gone 19–7 against Minnesota, winning 16 straight games from 1963 to 2012, with an average margin of victory over 30 points.

1983
On September 17, 1983, No. 1 Nebraska, coming off a 44–6 week one win over No. 4 Penn State, traveled to Minneapolis. Nebraska racked up 790 yards of offense, nearly 600 of them rushing, en route to an 84–13 win over the Gophers, the worst loss in Minnesota history. Nebraska wide receiver Irving Fryar, who would go on to be the top pick in the 1984 NFL Draft, managed 230 yards of offense on five touches (three carries for 92 yards; two receptions for 138 yards). Future Heisman Trophy winner Mike Rozier carried 15 times for 196 yards and three touchdowns. Nebraska's entire 60-man travel roster had entered the game before the end of the third quarter.

The Cornhuskers would go on to set the all-time NCAA scoring record, while the Gophers lost their final ten games and finished 1–10.

$5 Bits of Broken Chair Trophy
The origin of the $5 Bits of Broken Chair Trophy is rooted in November 2014 banter between the Twitter accounts for Minnesota mascot Goldy Gopher and "Faux Pelini", a parody account of then-Nebraska head coach Bo Pelini. Goldy suggested a wager on the game with this tweet: "Hey @FauxPelini, how about a friendly wager for this weekend's game? Team that gets the most points gets a conference win? Seem fair?" Faux Pelini responded "OK how about if we [Nebraska] win you give me $5, if you [Minnesota] win I get to smash a wooden chair over your back". This prompted Goldy to start crowdsourcing Twitter followers and Reddit's college football community to design the "$5 Bits of Broken Chair Trophy". Many designs were quickly presented and eventually Goldy created a real trophy, which was brought to the 2014 game in Lincoln. Minnesota won 28–24 to take the trophy, their first victory in Lincoln since 1960; it also gave Minnesota their first winning streak against Nebraska since their 3-game streak from 1951 to 1954. 

The trophy received widespread acceptance from both fanbases, but both universities' administrations remained silent. The trophy changed hands for the first time on October 17, 2015, after Nebraska defeated Minnesota 48–25 in Minneapolis. Although Nebraska distanced itself from the trophy, in the weeks following the Cornhuskers' 2015 victory, the chair was seen with players and coaches, and made several appearances on the school's social media pages.  It was also taken to Minnesota spirit events by fans. 

In 2016, after Nebraska defeated Minnesota in Lincoln, the trophy seemingly disappeared. Inquiries to the Nebraska and Minnesota athletic departments revealed that neither school formally recognized the trophy as official, in a similar manner to the Floyd of Rosedale or Little Brown Jug. This essentially temporarily ended the $5 Bits of Broken Chair Trophy in any major capacity.

On September 12, 2017, it was announced, via Twitter, that Nebraska and Minnesota would again play for the $5 Bits of Broken Chair trophy, likely as an unofficial trophy game. Following an initial Reddit post where Huskers fans brainstormed ideas to keep the trophy alive, a new trophy was built. The trophy now serves as the focal point of fundraisers for Nebraska's Team Jack Foundation and Minnesota's Masonic Children's Hospital. The image of Faux Pelini on the $5 bill has been replaced with Herbie Husker. The other $5 bill still bears a picture of Goldy Gopher.

Game results

See also  
 List of NCAA college football rivalry games

References

College football rivalries in the United States
Minnesota Golden Gophers football
Nebraska Cornhuskers football
Big Ten Conference rivalries